The 1998 United States Senate election in Florida was held November 3, 1998 alongside other elections to the United States Senate in other states as well as elections to the United States House of Representatives and various state and local elections. Incumbent Democratic U.S. Senator Bob Graham won re-election to a third term. , this was the last time the Democrats have won the Class 3 Senate seat from Florida.

Democratic primary

Candidates 
 Bob Graham, incumbent United States Senator

Results

Republican primary

Candidates 
 Charlie Crist, State Senator
 Andy Martin, perennial candidate

Results

General election

Candidates 
 Bob Graham (D), incumbent U.S. Senator
 Charlie Crist (R), State Senator

Results 
Graham defeated Crist in a landslide, as Crist won just four counties in the state. There were no third party or independent candidates.

See also 
 1998 United States Senate elections

References 

United States Senate
Florida
1998